Douglas Fred Tewell (born August 27, 1949) is an American professional golfer who has won several tournaments at both the PGA Tour and Champions Tour level, including two senior major championships.

Tewell was born in Baton Rouge, Louisiana and reared in Stillwater, Oklahoma. He got started in the game by working as a caddie for his father. He attended Oklahoma State University in his hometown on a basketball scholarship his freshman year, but later switched to golf. Tewell graduated and turned pro in 1971.

Tewell joined the PGA Tour in 1975; his best year came in 1980 when he won the Sea Pines Heritage and IVB-Golf Classic. He won two more times on the Tour in the mid-1980s. His best finishes in a major were T-9 at the 1983 PGA Championship and T-10 at the 1986 PGA Championship. Tewell was forced off the PGA Tour at the age of 46 at the end of the 1995 season due to an orthopedic problem in his left elbow. He had arthroscopic surgery on the same elbow in 2005, a procedure he describes as "cleaning out scar tissue".

The biggest win in his career was his first on the Champions Tour. He won his first major, the Senior PGA Championship at the PGA National Resort & Spa in Palm Beach Gardens, Florida by seven shots over four other players including Tom Kite and Hale Irwin.

Tewell lives today in Edmond, Oklahoma with his wife Pam. They have a daughter, Kristie, and a son, Jay. Kristie is married to former Nationwide Tour player Pat Bates.

Professional wins

PGA Tour wins (4)

PGA Tour playoff record (1–0)

Other wins (4)
1978 South Central PGA Championship
1982 Oklahoma Open
1988 Acom Team Championship (with Bob Gilder)
1995 Jerry Ford Invitational

Champions Tour wins (8)

*Note: The 2000 PGA Seniors' Championship was shortened to 54 holes due to rain.

Champions Tour playoff record (1–1)

Results in major championships

Note: Tewell never played in The Open Championship

CUT = missed the half-way cut
"T" = tied

Results in The Players Championship

CUT = missed the halfway cut
WD = withdrew
"T" indicates a tie for a place

Champions Tour major championships

Wins (2)

References

External links

American male golfers
Oklahoma State Cowboys golfers
PGA Tour golfers
PGA Tour Champions golfers
Winners of senior major golf championships
Golfers from Louisiana
Golfers from Oklahoma
American men's basketball players
Oklahoma State Cowboys basketball players
Sportspeople from Baton Rouge, Louisiana
Sportspeople from Edmond, Oklahoma
People from Stillwater, Oklahoma
1949 births
Living people